LJD Law College is a self financing law college situated beside Nainan Road at Punnya, Falta, South 24 Parganas in the Indian state of West Bengal. This college is affiliated to the University of Calcutta. It offers 5-year Integrated Course in Law leading to B.A. LL.B. degree which is approved by the Higher Education Department, Government of West Bengal and Bar Council of India (BCI), New Delhi.

History
LJD Law college was established in 2015 by the L.J.D. Educational Group.

See also 
List of colleges affiliated to the University of Calcutta
Education in India
Education in West Bengal
Law Commission of India
Shyambazar Law College

References

External links
LJD Law College

University of Calcutta affiliates
Educational institutions established in 2018
Law schools in West Bengal
Universities and colleges in South 24 Parganas district
2015 establishments in West Bengal